Pulliam is a surname of English and Welsh origin. Notable people with the surname include:

Dolph Pulliam (born 1946), American basketball player
Eugene C. Pulliam (1889–1975), American newspaper publisher and businessman
Eugene S. Pulliam (1914–1999), American newspaper publisher, son of Eugene C. Pulliam
Harry Pulliam (1869–1909), American baseball executive
Harvey Pulliam (born 1967), American baseball player
James Pulliam (1863–1934), Lieutenant Governor of Colorado
Keshia Knight Pulliam (born 1979), Jamaican American actress
Myrta Pulliam (born 1947), American journalist, daughter of Eugene S. Pulliam
Nicole Pulliam (born 1982), American actress
Samuel H. Pulliam (1841–1908), Confederate soldier and Virginia politician

See also
Sarah Pulliam Bailey, American journalist 
Shirley Nathan-Pulliam (born 1939), American politician
Flagstaff Pulliam Airport in Flagstaff, Arizona
Grape Creek-Pulliam Independent School District in Tom Green County, Texas, now known as the Grape Creek Independent School District
J. P. Pulliam Generating Station, a power station in Green Bay, Wisconsin

References